Nyole (also Olunyole, Lunyole, Lunyore, Nyoole, Nyore, Olunyore) is a Bantu language spoken by the Luhya people in Vihiga District, Kenya. There is 61% lexical similarity with a related but different Nyole dialect in Uganda.

The Nyore people border the Luo, Maragoli and Kisa Luhya tribes.

See also
 Luhya language

References

Languages of Kenya
Luhya language